Lath and plaster is a building process used to finish mainly interior dividing walls and ceilings. It consists of narrow strips of wood (laths) which are nailed horizontally across the wall studs or ceiling joists and then coated in plaster. The technique derives from an earlier, more primitive process called wattle and daub.

Lath and plaster largely fell out of favour in the U.K. after the introduction of plasterboard in the 1930s. In Canada and the United States, wood lath and plaster remained in use until the process was replaced by transitional methods followed by drywall (the North American term for plasterboard) in the mid-twentieth century.

Description

The wall or ceiling finishing process begins with wood or metal laths. These are narrow strips of wood, extruded metal, or split boards, nailed horizontally across the wall studs or ceiling joists. Each wall frame is covered in lath, tacked at the studs.

In Canada and the United States the laths were generally sawn, but in the United Kingdom and its colonies, riven or split hardwood laths of random lengths and sizes, were often used. Early American examples featured split beam construction, as did examples put up in rural areas of the U.S. and Canada well into the second half of the 19th century. Splitting the timber along its grain greatly improved the laths' strength and durability. As Americans and Canadians expanded west, saw mills were not always available to create neatly planed boards and the first crop of buildings in any new western or northern settlement would be put up with split beam lath. In some areas of the U.K. reed mat was also used as a lath. 

Temporary lath guides are then placed vertically to the wall, usually at the studs. Lime or gypsum plaster is then applied, typically using a wooden board as the application tool. A helper feeds new plaster onto the board, as the plaster is applied in quantity. When the wall is fully covered, the vertical lath "guides" are removed, and their "slots" are filled in, leaving a fairly uniform undercoat.

A smooth, white finish coat goes on last. After the plaster is completely dry, the walls are ready to be painted. In this article's photo ("lath seen from the back...") the curls of plaster are called keys and are necessary to keep the plaster on the lath. Traditional lime based mortar/plaster often incorporates horsehair which reinforces the plasterwork, thereby helping to prevent the keys from breaking away.

Historical transition
In addition to wood lath, various types of metal lath began to be used toward the end of the 19th century. Metal lath is categorized according to weight, type of ribbing, and whether the lath is galvanized or not.  Metal lathing was spaced across a  center, attached by tie wires using lathers' nippers.  Sometimes, the mesh was dimpled to be self-furring.

In use as early as 1900, rock lath (also known as "button board," "plaster board" or "gypsum-board lath"), is a type of gypsum wall board (essentially an early form of drywall) with holes spaced regularly to provide a 'key' for wet plaster. Rock lath was typically produced in sheets sized . By the late 1930s, rock lath was the primary method used in residential plastering.

Lath and plaster methods have mostly been replaced with modern drywall or plasterboard, which is inferior, but is faster and less expensive to install. Drywall possesses poor sound dampening qualities and can be easily damaged by moisture. Traditional lime based plasters are resistant to moisture and provide excellent sound isolation.

Advantages
One continued advantage of using traditional lath is for ornamental or unusual shapes. For instance, building a rounded wall would be difficult if drywall were used exclusively, as drywall is not flexible enough to allow tight radii. Wire mesh, often used for exterior stucco, is also found in combination or replacement of lath and plaster which serves similar purpose.

Traditional lath and plaster (including rock and metal lath varieties) has superior sound-proofing qualities when used with lime or gypsum plaster, which is denser than modern drywall.

In many historic buildings lath and plaster ceilings play a major role for the prevention of fire spread. They are critical to the protection of horizontal elements such as timber joisted floors, including the flooring on top, which in terms of fire performance is often in a poor condition due to the presence of gaps.

See also
 Laths
 Stucco

References

External links

 Plaster Base Installation, Building Construction & Finishing
 Preservation Brief No. 21 by the National Park Service.  Contains detailed descriptions of Lath & Plaster construction and advisories on repairing and restoring these walls (especially in historic buildings).

Building engineering
Building
Plastering